Alfred Haxton (born 25 July 1941) is a South African cricketer. He played in 33 first-class and 3 List A matches for Border from 1963/64 to 1974/75.

See also
 List of Border representative cricketers

References

External links
 

1941 births
Living people
South African cricketers
Border cricketers